Quintessence, or fifth essence, may refer to:

Cosmology 
 Aether (classical element), in medieval cosmology and science, the fifth element that fills the universe beyond the terrestrial sphere
 Quintessence (physics), a hypothetical form of dark energy, postulated to explain the accelerating expansion of the universe

Literature 

 Quintessence: Basic Readings from the Philosophy of W. V. Quine, essays by Willard Van Orman Quine
 Quintessence: The Quality of Having It, a 1983 book by Betty Cornfeld and Owen Edwards
  Works by Lawrence M. Krauss:
 The Fifth Essence, a 1989 book
 Quintessence: The Search for Missing Mass in the Universe, a 2000 book
 Quintessence,  a 2013 science fiction book by David Walton

Media companies 
 Quintessence Films, a film production company
 Quintessence International Publishing Group, a publishing company founded in Berlin, Germany

Music
 Quintessence Records, a budget label

Bands
 Quintessence (English band), 1970s progressive rock band specializing in Indian themes and sounds
 Quintessence (French band), black metal band, founded in 2005

Albums
 The Quintessence, by Quincy Jones and his orchestra, 1962
 Quintessence (Quintessence album), 1970
 Quintessence (Bill Evans album), 1976
 Quintessence (Borknagar album), 2000
 Quintessential,  by Steam Powered Giraffe, 2016 
 Quintessence (Spontaneous Music Ensemble album)

Songs
 "Quintessence", by Darkthrone, from album Panzerfaust
 "Quintessence", by Rotting Christ, from album Genesis
 "Quintessence", by Mastodon, from album Crack the Skye
 "In Quintessence", by Squeeze, from album East Side Story
 "Quintessence", by Marketa Irglová, featuring Emilíana Torrini and Aukai, 2020 single

Video games 

 "Quintessence: The Blighted Venom", a game by Freebird Games

Proper names 
 Quintessence (horse), a thoroughbred racer (1900–1917)
 The Quintessence, a DC Comics group of mutually consulting cosmic beings: see resp. Ganthet section

Restaurants 
 Quintessence (restaurant), a Michelin 3-star Japanese French fusion restaurant in Shinagawa, Japan.

See also 
 Quintessenz, an Austrian on-line civil liberties advocacy organization
 Quintessons, fictional characters from the Transformers franchise
 Fifth Element (disambiguation)